Will Miller (born 20 January 1993) is an Australian professional rugby union player for the ACT Brumbies in Super Rugby. His position is flanker.

Career
He made his debut for the Rebels against the Sharks playing all 80 minutes for the Rebels in a 9–9 draw.

Super Rugby statistics

References

External links
 Will Miller - rugby.com.au

1993 births
Australian rugby union players
Rugby union flankers
Melbourne Rebels players
Living people
New South Wales Country Eagles players
New South Wales Waratahs players
ACT Brumbies players
Canberra Vikings players
Sydney (NRC team) players